Jane Srygley Mouton (April 15, 1930 in Port Arthur, Texas – December 7, 1987) was an American management theorist, remembered in particular for developing the Managerial grid model with Robert R. Blake.

Biography
Her father, Theodore Quarles Srygley, was an educator and her mother, Grace Stumpe Srygley, was a psychologist.  She married an investor, Jackson, C. Mouton, Jr. on December 22, 1953.  The Moutons had two daughters named Jane Martha and Jacquelyn Cruse.

Jane Srygley Mouton received her Bachelor of Science in Mathematical Education from the University of Texas at Austin in 1950 and later returned to complete a PhD in 1957 (Contemporary, 2004).  She also received a Masters of Science from Florida State University in 1951.  She was loyal to the University of Texas at Austin with her working positions including being a research scientist from 1953–1957, a social science researcher and instructor from 1957–1959, and assistant professor of psychology from 1959-1964.  She was furthermore vice-president of Scientific Methods Inc. from 1961–1981 and has presided as president of the company since 1982.

Mouton was a former student of Robert Blake from the University of Texas.  Together they are known for their creation of the aforementioned Managerial Grid which was admittedly composed of Mouton’s creation and Blake’s name (Bokeno, 2007).

The Grid came into existence when Blake and Mouton were hired as consultants by Exxon.  It was during this time that their supposedly combined efforts produced the grid as a method of finding a median between McGregor’s Theory X and Theory Y workers (Capstone, 2003).  Originally, their work was reflected upon the National Training Laboratories (NTL) who they had worked with as a means of bringing their ideas into the organizations (Kleiner, 1996).

Mouton was among the few women to lead one of the NTL’s T-Groups (Training Groups) during the 1950s.  However, Blake and Mouton’s methodology was more focused on treating the organizational issues rather than simply diagnosing them.  This was contrary to standard NTL practices.  Thus, they separated from the company.  Blake had copyrighted the Grid so that only by franchising with him could someone else use the Grid for training, thus ensuring that everyone would use it in the way Blake and Mouton deemed fitting.  Therefore, through their work with NTL leading T-Group’s and the creation of Mouton’s Managerial Grid, Blake and Mouton became famous, eventually co-founding Scientific Methods, Inc. in 1961 (Ultimate, 2003).

Honors

Honorary member of the faculty at the Institute of Business Administration and Management in Tokyo, Japan
Best Writing Award from the American Society for Training and Development (1961–1962)
Book Award from the American College of Hospital Administrators for The New Managerial Grid  (1980)
Book of the Year Award from the American Journal of Nursing (1982) for Grid Approaches for Managerial Leadership in Nursing
Book of the Year Award from the American Management Association (1982) for Productivity:  The Human Side

References
Bokeno, M. COM 645 lecture, October 5, 2007.
Dubois, E.C. (2006). Three decades of women’s history. Women’s Studies, 35(1), 47-64.
Editors of Contemporary Authors. (2004–2007). Mouton, Jane Srygley. Contemporary Authors. Retrieved October 9, 2007 from Amazon’s Web site:  www.amazon.com.
Kleiner, A. (1996). The age of heretics. New York:  Doubleday.
Miller-Bernal, L. & Poulson, S. L. (2004). Going co-ed:  Women’s experiences in formerly men’s colleges and universities 1950-2000. Nashville, TN:  Vanderbilt University Press.
Wiley Editors. (2003). Blake, Robert and Jane Mouton. Capstone Encyclopedia of Business. Retrieved November 20, 2007, from Credo Reference’s Web site:  http://www.credoreference.com/entry/5861884.
Wiley Editors. (2003). Robert Blake and Jane Mouton, The Managerial Grid. The Ultimate Business Library. Retrieved November 20, 2007, from Credo Reference’s Web site:  http://www.credoreference.com/entry/2236017.

Florida State University alumni
1930 births
1987 deaths